Pedro Luis Martínez Larriba (born 27 April 1946) is a Spanish playwright. He won the 1986 Margarita Xirgu prize for his radio play ¿Hay alguien escuchando ahí? ('Is Anyone Out There Listening?').

References 

1946 births
Living people
Spanish dramatists and playwrights
Spanish male dramatists and playwrights